Brachypipona is a palearctic genus of potter wasps.

References

 Vecht, J.v.d. & J.M. Carpenter. 1990. A Catalogue of the genera of the Vespidae (Hymenoptera). Zoologische Verhandelingen 260: 3 - 62.

Biological pest control wasps
Potter wasps